Pallickal (also known as Pallikkal River) is a river in Kerala, India. It rises from the lower foothills of the Western Ghats near Kodumon at an elevation less than +60 MSL, north-east of Adoor. The river has a length of 42 km with a drainage area of 220 square kilometres and falls into the Vattakayal Lake near Karunagappally.

Course
The Pallickal River originates from the lower foothills of the Western Ghats near Kodumon, Pathanamthitta district. It initially flows through several towns towards the west. It passes through the towns of Adoor, Vadakkathukavu, Peringanad, Nellimukal, Nooranad, Pallickal, Sooranad, Pavumpa, Pavumpa-Churuli, Thodiyur, Vadakkumthala, Kuttivattom, Mynagapally, Karunagapally, Ayanivelikulangara and Kandathil. at reaching Ponmana near Karunagapally the river empties into the Arabian Sea through Ashtamudi Lake. The flow of Pallikkal River and Pavumpa stream together forming the Vattakayal Lake which is surrounded by Pavumpa, Pavumpa - Churuli, Pavumpa-Manappally and Thodiyur. Pavumpa-Churuli, one of the most beautiful places Karunagappaly is lying in between the Vattakkayal and Pallikal river (Pallikkalaru). 

Rivers of Kollam district
Rivers of Pathanamthitta district